The first GeGeGe no Kitarō anime was aired from January 3, 1968 to March 30, 1969. It ran for 65 episodes. Like all of the subsequent Kitarō anime, it was produced by Toei Animation and aired on Fuji TV.

Episode list

References

1968